Mong Deng Atit is a South Sudanese footballer who currently plays as a midfielder.

International career
He has made two senior appearances for South Sudan against Ethiopia and Kenya in the 2012 CECAFA Cup. He received a yellow card against Kenya.

References

Living people
South Sudanese footballers
South Sudan international footballers
Association football midfielders
Year of birth missing (living people)